Syriac studies is the study of the Syriac language and Syriac Christianity. A specialist in Syriac studies is known as a Syriacist. Specifically, British, French, and German scholars of the 18th and 19th centuries who were involved in the study of Syriac/Aramaic language and literature were commonly known by this designation, at a time when the Syriac language was little understood outside Assyrian, Syriac Christian and Maronite Christian communities. In Germany the field of study is distinguished between Aramaistik (Aramaic studies) and Neuaramaistik (Neo-Aramaic (Syriac) studies).

At universities Syriac studies are mostly incorporated into a more 'general' field of studies, such as Eastern Christianity at the School of Oriental and African Studies, University of London, Aramaic studies at the University of Oxford and University of Leiden, Eastern Christianity at Duke University, or Semitic studies at the Freie Universität Berlin. Most students learn the Syriac language within a biblical studies program. Conferences for Syriac studies include the Symposium Syriacum, the Section "Bible and Syriac Studies in Context" at the International Meetings of the Society of Biblical Literature, and the Section "Syriac Literature and Interpretations of Sacred Texts" at the Annual Meetings of the Society of Biblical Literature.

Syriac academic journals include the annual Oriens Christianus (Wiesbaden) and Syriac Studies Today. Syriaca.org is a centralized academic portal for Syriac studies.

See also

Assyrian people
Assyrianism
Assyria
Assyrian continuity
Aramea
Arameanism
Phoenicia
Phoenicianism
Syriac Christianity
Assyrian Church of the East
Syriac Orthodox Church
Chaldean Catholic Church
Nestorian Church
Ancient Church of the East
Maronite Church
Syriac Catholic Church
Assyrian Pentecostal Church
Assyrian Evangelical Church
Etymology of Syria
Names for Syriac Christians
Mesopotamian religion
Syriac alphabet
Syriac literature
Peshitta
Ephrem the Syrian
Assyrian culture
Assyrian music
Syriac sacral music
Corpus Scriptorum Christianorum Orientalium
Eastern Aramaic
Turoyo
Syrian Arabic

References

External links 
Sebastian P. Brock, The Contribution of Departed Syriacists, 1997-2006† , HUGOYE: JOURNAL OF SYRIAC STUDIES

Syriac Christianity
Middle Eastern studies
Aramaic languages
Cultural studies
Semitic studies